Encephalartos transvenosus is a palm-like cycad in the family Zamiaceae, with a localized distribution in Limpopo, South Africa. Its common names, Modjadji's cycad or Modjadji's palm, allude to the female dynasty of the Lobedu people, the Rain Queens, whose hereditary name is Modjadji. The queen resides near a valley (of late a nature reserve) which is densely forested with these cycads, which they protected and hold sacred. The species name transvenosus refers to the fine network of veins between the main veins. These can be seen when the leaf is held up to the light.

Description
The tree grows up to twelve metres tall with a thick trunk deeply scored in a netted pattern. This is crowned by nearly straight, shiny, spiny pinnate leaves up to two and a half metres long. The leaflets are broad, the middle ones up to about three centimetres in width, slightly curved and with small marginal teeth. Two to four large cones are borne in the heart of the leaves. The female cone may reach eighty centimetres long, weigh thirty four kilograms and have brilliant orange-red seeds.

Range
Modjadji's cycad grows in the mountains of Limpopo Province particularly on two hills east near Modjadjiskloof (formerly Duiwelskloof). It is a tall majestic tree and has been protected by generations of rainqueens. It forms pure forests on these hills, the only cycad forests in Southern Africa.

References

External links
 
 
 Cycad Pages: Encephalartos transvenosus
 

Transvenosus
Trees of South Africa
Limpopo
Least concern plants
Flora of the Northern Provinces